Benzene hexachloride may refer to: 

 Hexachlorocyclohexane
 Lindane, its gamma isomer, an insecticide

Hexachlorobenzene, a fungicide